Vlatko Lozanoski - Lozano (born 27 June 1985) is a Macedonian singer. Together with Esma Redžepova, he represented Macedonia in the Eurovision Song Contest 2013 in Malmö, Sweden.

Career 
His first public appearance was as a participant in the talent show Mak Dzvezdi (September 2007 - May 2008). A month later, he won the Grand Prix on the first Macedonian Radio Festival called Starry Night.
He sang the song "Vrati Me" which was also his first official single. His second single was called "Obicen Bez Tebe". In October 2008, singing his only third official single at the time "Vremeto Da Zastane", Lozano was awarded by the jury the Debut Prize at MakFest, the most prestigious music festival in Republic of Macedonia. Two days later, on the final evening he won the MakFest Grand Prix which was awarded by the audience. "Sonce Ne Me Gree" was his next single. In February 2009, he participated in Macedonia's national selection for the Eurovision Song Contest 2009 singing his fifth single "Blisku Do Mene" and was placed fourth. The song was elected to represent Macedonia on The Virtual Eurosong Festival "Second Chance". In June 2009 Lozano participated on the Pjesma Mediterana Festival in Budva, Montenegro. In July, he participated  on the Slavianski Bazar Festival in Vitebsk, Belarus and won the second prize. Next, Lozano performed "I'm Your Angel" along with Magdalena Cvetkoska on the Golden Wings Festival in Moldova, and they won the second prize. He was also awarded the Best Male Voice. His first album named "Lozano" was released in early 2010. In February 2010 he participated in the Macedonian national selection for the Eurovision Song Contest 2010 singing "Letam kon tebe". He ended up in the fourth place.

Eurovision Song Contest 2013 
On 28 December 2012, Macedonian Radio-Television (MRT) announced that Lozanoski along with Esma Redžepova would represent Macedonia in the Eurovision Song Contest 2013 to be held in Malmö, Sweden, with the song "Pred da se razdeni". The song failed to qualify from the second semi-final of the competition on 16 May 2013, placing 16th in the field of 17 songs, scoring 28 points.

Discography

Albums
 Lozano (2010)
 Preku sedum morinja (2012)
 Deset (2018)

Events and awards
  Zvezdena Noḱ Radiski Festival, Ohrid, Macedonia (2008) – Grand Prix 
  MakFest, Štip, Macedonia (2008) – Grand Prix and Best debut 
  Skopje Fest 2009 – 4th place 
  Pjesma Mediterana, Budva, Montenegro (2009)
  Slavianski Bazaar in Vitebsk,  Vitebsk, Belarus (2009) – 2nd place 
  Golden Wings, Chișinău, Moldova (2009) – 2nd place and Best Male Vocalist 
  MARS Radiski Festival, Skopje, Macedonia (2009) – Most Listened Song on Radio Stations and most listened song of the audience in Macedonia 
 Skopje Fest 2010 – 4th Place  
 Sea Songs, Sevastopol, Ukraine (2010) – 4th Place

External links
 Lozano - Vlatko Lozanoski Official Website
 Vlatko Lozanoski Official Fan Klub

See also
Music of the Republic of Macedonia

References

1985 births
Living people
Macedonian pop singers
People from Kičevo
21st-century Macedonian male singers
Eurovision Song Contest entrants of 2013
Eurovision Song Contest entrants for North Macedonia